The Redbreast class comprised nine first-class screw-driven composite gunboats built for the Royal Navy in 1889, mounting six guns.

Construction

Design
The Redbreast class were designed by Sir William Henry White, the Royal Navy Director of Naval Construction in 1888.  The hull was of composite construction, that is, iron keel, frames, stem and stern posts with wooden planking.  These were the last class of composite-hulled gunboats built for the Royal Navy - the next class of gunboat, the Bramble-class gunboat of 1898, was of steel construction.

Propulsion
The class was fitted with a triple-expansion reciprocating steam engine developing 1,200 indicated horsepower, sufficient to propel them at  through a single screw.

Sail plan
The class was given a barquentine rig.

Armament
The first four ships were armed with six 4-inch/25-pounder (25cwt) quick firing guns and four machine guns.  The last five had an additional pair of 3-pounder quick firing guns in place of two of the machine guns.

Ships

References

External links

 

 
 Redbreast
Gunboat classes